Anelisa Phewa (born 3 May 1983), is a South African actor, singer, dancer and musician. He is best known for the roles in the films Attack on Darfur, Themba and More Than Just a Game.

Personal life
Phewa was born on 3 May 1983 in Kwa-Zulu Natal, South Africa. In 2001, he matriculated from St. Dominic's Academy in Newcastle, Kwa-Zulu Natal. Then in 2005, he graduated with his BA degree in Theatre and Performance from the University of Cape Town.

Career
He made television debut in 1993 with the television serial Generations and played the role "Lungelo". In 2006, he rendered his voice to the lead role of Pax Africa in the children's animated series URBO: The Adventures of Pax Africa, which aired on Saturday mornings on SABC3. Then in 2007, he made the film debut with a minor role in the film The World Unseen. In the same year, he acted in the film More Than Just a Game, which received critics acclaim.

After that, he played a supportive role in the television serial Divers Down. Then in 2009, he played the role "Lwazi Ntili" in the serial Montana. In the same year, he performed in the stage play Private Lives. In 2012 he joined the SABC2 soap opera 7de Laan and played the role of "Sifiso". He continued to play the role until 2016. On 28 September 2019, he joined with charity program "Cupcakes 4 Kids with Cancer" to celebrate the National Cupcake Day held at Pack ‘n Spice in Horison, Roodepoort.

Filmography

References

External links
 IMDb

Living people
South African male film actors
1983 births